The ninety-second Cabinet of Bulgaria took office on 27 January 2017, following the resignation of the Second Borisov Government. The government led the country through to the 26 March parliamentary elections.

Cabinet

References

92